Wan Zaharulnizam bin Wan Zakaria (born 8 May 1991) is a Malaysian professional footballer who plays as a winger. He is an exciting prospect. He is known for his ability to dribble.

Club career

Early career
Zaharul began his football career playing for Kelantan President's Cup team in 2010 at age 20 before been discovered by Ong Kim Swee to play in Harimau Muda. Zaharul, or better known by his nickname 'Kecik' due to his small stature, has been in the Harimau Muda's setup since 2010, beginning with Harimau Muda B and promoted to Harimau Muda A in 2011.

F.C. Ryūkyū
Malaysian media reported in early March 2012 that Zaharul, along with teammate Zack Haikal is to attend trial with Japan Football League side F.C. Ryūkyū after impressing the Japanese side talent spotter during Malaysia's 2–0 defeat to Japan in the 2012 Olympic qualifiers match in Tosu. They successfully completed the 2-week trial with the Japanese club in July.

In March 2013, Zack Haikal was officially offered a two-year contract, but Zaharul did not. Instead, 19-year-old Nazirul Naim was offered a contract instead.

Kelantan
In November 2013, Zaharul signed two years contract with his hometown side Kelantan.

Pahang
In December 2016, Zaharul left Kelantan for Pahang. It was announced by his sports representative agency, MVP Sports Agency via their social media that Zaharul have joined Pahang for the 2017 season. Zaharul made his league debut for Pahang in 5–0 win over T-Team on 27 January 2017. Made no impact on the team for 2017 season, hence 2018 should not be much different.

Career statistics

Club

International career
Zaharulnizam made his international debut for the Malaysia national team in a friendly match with Australia, where Malaysia suffers a heavy 5–0 defeat, on 7 October 2011.

He is also a member of the Malaysia U-23 team, who were competing in the 2012 Olympic qualifiers. He also helps Malaysia to retain the men's football gold medal in the 2011 SEA Games.

International goals

Under-23

Honours

Club
Kelantan
Malaysia FA Cup runner-up: 2015

Sri Pahang
Malaysia FA Cup: 2018

International
Harimau Muda A
 International U-21 Thanh Niên Newspaper Cup (1): 2012

Malaysia U-23
 Southeast Asian Games Gold Medal (1): 2011
 Merdeka Tournament (1): 2013

Individual
PFAM Player of the Month: May 2015

References

External links
 

1991 births
Living people
Malaysian footballers
Malaysia international footballers
People from Kelantan
Kelantan FA players
Sri Pahang FC players
Melaka United F.C. players
Malaysia Super League players
Association football wingers
Malaysian people of Malay descent
Southeast Asian Games gold medalists for Malaysia
Southeast Asian Games medalists in football
Competitors at the 2011 Southeast Asian Games